Diego de Arce y Reinoso Ávila y Palomares (25 April 1587 – 18 July 1665) was a Spanish bishop who served as Grand Inquisitor of Spain from 1643 to 1665; and as Bishop of Plasencia (1640–1652), Bishop of Ávila (1637–1640), and Bishop of Tui (1635–1637).

Biography

Diego de Arce y Reinoso was born in Zalamea de la Serena on 25 April 1587, the son of Fernando de Arce y Reynoso, Lord of Arce, and his wife Catalina Ávila y Palomares.  He was baptized on 3 May 1587.

Becoming a churchman, he gained the favor of Philip IV of Spain, who appointed him to the Real Cancillería de Granada, the Audiencia de Sevilla, and the Council of Castile. The king also arranged for him to become successively Bishop of Tuy (1635–37), Bishop of Ávila (1637–40), and Bishop of Plasencia (1640–52). On 3 Feb 1636, he was consecrated bishop by Fernando Valdés Llano, Archbishop of Granada, with Gaspar Prieto Orduña, Bishop of Alghero, and Miguel Avellán, Auxiliary Bishop of Seville serving as co-consecrators.

He became Grand Inquisitor of Spain on 14 November 1643, holding that position until 1665. He was long involved in plans to found a school in Zalamea, but the Portuguese Restoration War prevented the beginning of construction of the school until after his death.  He died on 19 July 1665.

Episcopal succession

While bishop, he was the principal consecrator of:

References

External links and additional sources
 (for Chronology of Bishops) 
 (for Chronology of Bishops) 
 (for Chronology of Bishops) 
 (for Chronology of Bishops) 
 (for Chronology of Bishops)  
 (for Chronology of Bishops) 
 Brief Biography from Spanish-language website 

1587 births
1665 deaths
Grand Inquisitors of Spain
17th-century Roman Catholic bishops in Spain